Alicia Thompson (born 8 April 1981) is a Belizean racing cyclist. She is a six-time national champion, winning four time trial titles and two road race titles.

Major results
Source: 

2008
 2nd Road race, National Road Championships
2009 
 3rd Road race, National Road Championships
2010 
 National Road Championships
2nd Road race
2nd Time trial
2014 
 3rd Time trial, National Road Championships
2015 
 National Road Championships
1st  Time trial
3rd Road race
2016 
 1st  Time trial, National Road Championships
2017 
 National Road Championships
1st  Time trial
3rd Road race
2018
 National Road Championships
1st  Road race
2nd Time trial
2019
 3rd Time trial, National Road Championships
2021
 National Road Championships
1st  Road race
3rd Time trial
2022
 National Road Championships
1st  Time trial
2nd Road race

References

External links

1981 births
Living people
Belizean female cyclists
Cyclists at the 2018 Commonwealth Games
Cyclists at the 2022 Commonwealth Games
Commonwealth Games competitors for Belize
Place of birth missing (living people)